The Cutter and the Clan is the fifth album by Scottish Celtic rock band Runrig. It was the band's breakthrough album, taking them from cottage industry to the international stage. It was also the first Runrig album to feature keyboard player Pete Wishart - forming the "classic" line-up of the band through what would be their most commercially successful period. Originally recorded on the band’s own Ridge label, it was taken on board by Chrysalis Records as part of a 1987 major recording contract. Highlights include the song "An Ubhal as Àirde", which was later to become the first and only Scottish Gaelic language song to reach the UK Top 20, reaching #18 in 1995, following its use in an advert for Carlsberg lager.

Track listing
All songs written by Calum Macdonald and Rory Macdonald. 
 "Alba" (Scotland) - 4:02
 "The Cutter" - 3:51
 "Hearts of Olden Glory" - 2:14
 "Pride of the Summer" - 3:59
 "Worker for the Wind" - 3:30
 "Rocket to the Moon" - 4:59
 "The Only Rose" - 3:51
 "Protect and Survive" - 3:23
 "Our Earth Was Once Green" - 4:01
 "An Ubhal as Àirde" (The Highest Apple) - 3:47

Personnel
Runrig
Iain Bayne - drums, percussion
Malcolm Jones - guitars, pipes, mandolin
Calum Macdonald - percussion
Rory Macdonald - vocals, bass guitar, guitar, accordion
Donnie Munro - lead vocals
Peter Wishart - keyboards

References

1985 albums
Runrig albums
Scottish Gaelic music